Slowmotion Apocalypse is an Italian melodic death metal band formed in Pordenone in 2002 and currently signed to Scarlet Records. They released their third album Mothra in October 2009, recorded at Planet Red Studios, Richmond, VA, with producer Andreas Magnusson (The Black Dahlia Murder, The Agony Scene, We Were Gentlemen, Dufresne, Oh, Sleeper) and featuring Myke Terry from Bury Your Dead and Matt Rudzinski from Killwhitneydead. At the Gates vocalist Tomas Lindberg provided guest vocals on the song "The Blessing" on their second album, Obsidian, which was produced by Ettore Rigotti and released in 2007.

Members
Alberto "Albi" Zannier – vocals (since 2002)
Nicola "Nicolas" Milanese – guitar (since 2002)
Manuel "Sean" Gianella – guitar (since 2008)
Ivo Boscariol – bass (since 2002)
Tommaso "Tommy" Corte – drums (since 2002)

Former members
Ivan Odorico – guitar (2002–2008)

Discography

Studio albums
My Own Private Armageddon (2005)
Obsidian (2007)
Mothra (2009)

Demos
Demo 2002 (2002)

Music videos
Insomniac
Fuel For My Hatred

References

External links
Official website
Slowmotion Apocalypse at Scarlet Records

Italian death metal musical groups
Musical groups established in 2002
2002 establishments in Italy
Scarlet Records artists